Hanc Llagami(born 1 June 1995 in Tirana) is an Albanian professional footballer who most recently played for Dinamo Tirana in the Albanian First Division.

References

1995 births
Living people
Footballers from Tirana
Albanian footballers
Association football midfielders
Association football defenders
KF Tirana players
FK Dinamo Tirana players